Quinton Bell (born May 9, 1996) is an American football outside linebacker for the Atlanta Falcons of the National Football League (NFL). He played college football at Prairie View A&M.

Professional career

Oakland Raiders
Bell was drafted by the Oakland Raiders in the seventh round with the 230th overall pick in the 2019 NFL Draft. He was waived on August 31, 2019, and re-signed to the practice squad. He was released on October 15.

Tampa Bay Buccaneers
On November 5, 2019, Bell was signed to the Tampa Bay Buccaneers practice squad. He signed a reserve/future contract with the Buccaneers on December 30, 2019.

Bell was waived by the Buccaneers on October 26, 2020, and re-signed to the practice squad two days later.

On February 9, 2021, Bell re-signed with the Buccaneers. He was waived on August 22, 2021.

Atlanta Falcons
On September 1, 2021, Bell was signed to the Atlanta Falcons practice squad. He signed a reserve/future contract with the Falcons on January 10, 2022.

Bell made the Falcons roster in 2022, playing three games before being waived on November 5, 2022 and re-signed to the practice squad. He signed a reserve/future contract on January 9, 2023.

References

External links
Tampa Bay Buccaneers bio
Prairie View A&M Panthers bio

1996 births
Living people
Players of American football from Long Beach, California
American football defensive ends
Prairie View A&M Panthers football players
Oakland Raiders players
Tampa Bay Buccaneers players
Atlanta Falcons players